Silverthread Falls is a waterfall located in Dingmans Ferry in Delaware Township, Pike County, Pennsylvania, United States, near Dingmans Falls in the Delaware Water Gap National Recreation Area.
It has a vertical drop of 24.3 m (80 ft). Both Silverthread Falls and Dingmans Falls are visible from a handicap-accessible trail. The trail begins at the parking lot for the Dingmans Falls Visitor Center.

See also
Bushkill Falls
Dingmans Falls

References

External links
Delaware Water Gap Visitor Centers

Gallery

Pocono Mountains
Waterfalls of Pennsylvania
Protected areas of Pike County, Pennsylvania
Tiered waterfalls
Waterfalls of Pike County, Pennsylvania
Delaware Water Gap National Recreation Area